Timothy Jon Bostock (born 21 January 1962) is a former English cricketer. Bostock was a right-handed batsman who bowled right-arm off break. He was born in Widnes, Lancashire.

He was educated at Merchant Taylors' School, Crosby in Liverpool, excelling at both cricket and rugby union whilst there.

Bostock made his debut for Cheshire in the 1992 Minor Counties Championship against Cornwall. Bostock played Minor counties cricket for Cheshire from 1992 to 1996, including 16 Minor Counties Championship matches and 8 MCCA Knockout Trophy matches. In 1992, he made his List A debut against Gloucestershire in the NatWest Trophy. He played three further List A matches for Cheshire, the last coming against Northamptonshire in the 1996 NatWest Trophy. In his four List A matches, he scored 57 runs at a batting average of 14.25, with a high score of 42. His highest score came against Essex in the 1995 NatWest Trophy. With the ball he bowled 11 wicket-less overs.

Following his retirement from playing,  he became involved in cricket administration.  He is currently the chief executive of Durham County Cricket Club. 

A keen golfer playing off 2 at Blackwell Golf Club in Worcestershire, he is Captain of the ten man team that contests the John Harrison Trophy twice a year against the OOM from Formby Golf Club.

References

External links
Timothy Bostock at ESPNcricinfo
Timothy Bostock at CricketArchive

1962 births
Living people
Sportspeople from Widnes
People educated at Merchant Taylors' Boys' School, Crosby
English cricketers
Cheshire cricketers